Azot may refer to:
 Azot (region), an historical and geographic region in North Macedonia
 Ahuizotl (AZOT), a gene involved in removing aged damaged cells in organisms
 Azote, the French name for nitrogen also used in many other languages
 Chemical plants in Ukraine:
 Azot (Cherkasy), located in Cherkasy
 Azot (Sievierodonetsk), located in Sievierodonetsk, Luhansk oblast
 Rivneazot, located in Rivne